is a former Japanese football player.

Playing career
Haji was born in Sakai on August 28, 1978. In November 2000, when he was a Tenri University student, he joined J1 League club Cerezo Osaka. On November 18, he debuted as substitute forward from the 78th minute against Yokohama F. Marinos. However he could only play this match until 2002. The club was also relegated to J2 League from 2002. In September 2002, he moved to Japan Football League club Sagawa Express Osaka. He played in 6 matches and scored 4 goals. In 2003, he moved to J2 club Montedio Yamagata. He played many matches as substitute forward. In 2004, he moved to J1 club JEF United Ichihara. However he could not play at all in the match. In September 2004, he moved to Kashiwa Reysol and played many matches. In 2005, he moved to newly was promoted to J2 League club, Tokushima Vortis. He became a regular player as forward and scored many goals. In July 2007, he moved to J1 club Ventforet Kofu. However he could not play many matches and the club was relegated to J2 from 2008. In 2008, he played many matches as substitute forward. In 2009, he moved to Tokushima Vortis. He played all 51 matches and scored 12 goals in 2009. However he could not play many matches in 2010 and retired end of 2010 season.

Club statistics

References

External links

1978 births
Living people
Tenri University alumni
Association football people from Osaka Prefecture
Japanese footballers
J1 League players
J2 League players
Japan Football League players
Cerezo Osaka players
Sagawa Shiga FC players
Montedio Yamagata players
JEF United Chiba players
Kashiwa Reysol players
Tokushima Vortis players
Ventforet Kofu players
Association football forwards
People from Sakai, Osaka